Warren Christopher Banks (April 4, 1973April 9, 2014) was an American football guard in the National Football League.  Drafted out of the University of Kansas by the Broncos in the seventh round of the 1996 NFL Draft, Banks won a Super Bowl ring as a member of the Broncos' Super Bowl XXXIII championship team in 1998.  Banks also played for the Barcelona Dragons and Atlanta Falcons.  Banks died at his home in Abingdon, Maryland on April 9, 2014.

References

External links
 Just Sports Stats
 Pro Football Reference Page

1973 births
2014 deaths
People from Lexington, Missouri
Players of American football from Missouri
American football offensive guards
Kansas Jayhawks football players
Denver Broncos players
Atlanta Falcons players
Barcelona Dragons players
People from Abingdon, Maryland